Museum of St. Maximilian Kolbe "There was a Man" (Polish: Muzeum św. Maksymiliana "Był człowiek") - is a museum, located in Niepokalanów monastery in central Poland. Dedicated to the life and work of its founder - father Maximilian Kolbe, evangelization activity of Niepokalanów, and the Franciscan missions throughout the world.

Founding of the museum 
The museum is located in one of the old buildings in Niepokalanów, where there used to be a laundry and a carpenter's workshop. The exhibition, which spans three rooms, was created by the employees of the Museum of the town of Pabianice. Now it's opened to visitors every day from 8.00 to 18.00.

On 6 August 1998, two compartments of the museum were opened to the public and blessed by Cardinal Józef Glemp, who expressed his hope that the new exhibition will be a good catechesis, showing the visitors a shortest path to God. A month later, on 20 September 1998, the museum was extended and a third compartment (missionary) was opened by Franciscan bishop Jan Wilk, working in Brazil mission.

Exhibitions 
In the first compartment visitors are welcomed by the statue of St. Maximilian, made of bronze by the Italian sculptor Roberto Joppolo of Viterbo. The statue was blessed by Pope John Paul II in October 1982 during the ceremony of canonization of St. Maximilian Kolbe.

In the second part a visitor can see pre-war photographs and exhibits with explanations concerning the life and activity of the founder of Niepokalanów - St. Maximilian - since his childhood, through youth, studies, Japan mission until building a large publishing monastery, called Niepokalanów. There is also a replica of his second flat in the monastery, where he lived since 1936 (after returning from Japan) till 1941 (when he was arrested). The third room presents collection from the Franciscan missions in the world, offered mostly by the missionaries working in Japan, Brazil, Zambia, Peru, Kenya or Tanzania.

There are some peculiar pieces in this collection:
- a portrait of St. Maximilian made from post stamps;
- dried piranhas and skin of exotic snake;
- an image of the Mother of God woven from cereal grains.

Photo gallery

References

Further reading 
 O. Mariusz Paczóski, 70 lat Niepokalanowa (Seventy years of Niepokalanów). Wydawnictwo Ojców Franciszkanów, Niepokalanów 1999,  (book in Polish)
 Saint Maximilian’s 'City of the Immaculata' - historical information
 Miasto Niepokalanej (City of the Immaculate - article in Polish), p. 216-219, in: Rycerz Niepokalanej (The Knight of the Immaculate) nr 7-8/2010, Niepokalanów, ISSN 0208-8878 (article in Polish)

Museum of St. Maximilian Kolbe
Museum of St. Maximilian Kolbe
Museums established in 1998
Museums in Masovian Voivodeship
Religious museums in Poland
Biographical museums in Poland
20th-century religious buildings and structures in Poland